Prairie Bayou (March 4, 1990 – June 5, 1993) was an American Thoroughbred Champion racehorse owned and bred by Loblolly Stable of Lake Hamilton, Arkansas. Named for a bayou between Little Rock and Hot Springs in Arkansas, he was sired by Little Missouri and out of the mare Whiffling. Owned by Loblolly Stable, after Prairie Bayou's success on the racetrack, including the 1993 Preakness Stakes, Calumet Farm purchased Whiffling in foal to Danzig for $1,050,000 at the 1994 Keeneland November Sale.

Early racing career 
At age two Prairie Bayou won a maiden race and an allowance race. He went on to place second in his next two starts in stakes races. He finished as the runner-up in both the Inner Harbor Stakes and the Pappa Riccio Stakes. As a three-year-old he really began to show promise. He won the Count Fleet Stakes and the Whirlaway Stakes at Aqueduct in the first quarter of 1993. In March Prairie Bayou won the Spriral Stakes at Turfway Park. In April he won the grade one Blue Grass Stakes at Keeneland Race Course. Leading up to the 1993 Kentucky Derby, Prairie Bayou was made the betting favorite for the Derby, as well as for the other two Triple Crown races, Prairie Bayou was ridden by jockey Mike Smith. A come-from-behind horse, in the Derby he was caught far back in the large field for most of the race. In the final quarter, the gelding had to move to the far outside in order to make a strong stretch run that earned him a second-place finish behind Sea Hero.

Preakness Stakes and Death 
Prairie Bayou came back to win the Preakness Stakes, the second leg of the U.S. Triple Crown, but then broke down in the Belmont Stakes and was euthanized. Mike Smith, the jockey aboard Prairie Bayou, leaped off the horse as he broke down, and was unable as a result to pull him up and avoid further injury. He is buried at Longfield Farm near Goshen, Kentucky.

Pedigree

References

External links

Prairie Bayou's pedigree and partial racing stats

1990 racehorse births
1993 racehorse deaths
Horses who died from racing injuries
Racehorses bred in Kentucky
Racehorses trained in the United States
Preakness Stakes winners
Eclipse Award winners
American Grade 1 Stakes winners
Thoroughbred family 1-x